Waumandee is an unincorporated census-designated place located in the town of Waumandee, in Buffalo County, Wisconsin, United States. As of the 2010 census, its population is 68.

References

Census-designated places in Buffalo County, Wisconsin
Census-designated places in Wisconsin